Byala Slatina Municipality is a municipality in Vratsa Province, Bulgaria.

Demography

Religion
According to the latest Bulgarian census of 2011, the religious composition, among those who answered the optional question on religious identification, was the following:

References

Geography of Vratsa Province